Balkrishna Mohoni (15 April 1901 – 7 April 1980) was an Indian cricket umpire. He stood in eleven Test matches between 1949 and 1956. Mohoni played 11 first-class matches for Maharashtra, between 1934/35 and 1941/42.

See also
 List of Test cricket umpires

References

1901 births
1980 deaths
Cricketers from Pune
Indian Test cricket umpires
Indian cricketers
Maharashtra cricketers